is a city in Orange County, California. The city was incorporated in March 1960. The population was 11,780 at the 2020 census, up from 11,449 at the 2010 census. The adjacent unincorporated community of Rossmoor uses the same 90720 ZIP code in its mailing address, but is not part of the city. The Los Alamitos Race Course is named for the city, but lies in the neighboring city of Cypress.

The USA Water Polo National Aquatic Center is located on the Joint Forces Training Base - Los Alamitos.

History

The history of the area during the Californio period and after U.S. annexation is detailed in the article on Rancho Los Alamitos.   The town of Los Alamitos was established in 1896 by Lewellyn Bixby to support the new sugar beet factory in town built by the extremely wealthy Clark Brothers. William Andrews Clark, a future Senator from Montana, had built his fortune in mining, banking and logging in that state.  His younger brother, J. Ross Clark, managed their operations in California after he moved to that state for health reasons.  Lewellyn Bixby, whose family owned the surrounding land on the Rancho Los Cerritos and Rancho Los Alamitos, had been trying to build a sugar beet factory in that area for a few years but, due to financial losses in the 1880s, he no longer had the financial capital to undertake the sugar beet factory complex on his own.  Bixby had made his fortune back in the 1850s when he and his cousins Benjamin and Thomas Flint, formed Flint, Bixby & Co. which became a thriving entity in mutton and wool, all originally housed on the Rancho San Justo, south of San Jose.  After making an additional fortune from selling wool to the government during the Civil War, the Flints and Bixby bought up many properties in Southern California.  One was the future Irvine Ranch and another was the Rancho Los Cerritos which makes up much of the western half of Long Beach. Flint, Bixby hired Lewellyn's younger brother Jotham to manage the Cerritos.  When Flint, Bixby broke up Lewellyn assumed their Southern California properties and moved to Los Angeles and became the senior partner in his operations with his brother Jotham.

Around 1881, a cousin, John W. Bixby wanted to purchase the Rancho Los Alamitos.  John W. put together a consortium of himself, his cousins Lewellyn and Jotham (owners of Rancho Los Cerritos) and banker I.W. Hellman to finance the purchase of the Alamitos land. Upon John's sudden death on May 7, 1887, the ranch was divided between the three owning families. The northern third adjacent to the Rancho Los Cerritos — the land roughly north of present Orangewood Ave.—went to the Lewellyn-Jotham faction (which later became the Bixby Land Company). By the mid-1890s, after the crash following the land boom of the 1880s—this group was relatively cash-poor and land rich. Having experimented in Northern California with sugar beets, the Bixbys agreed to provide the land, and contracted with Montana copper baron William A. Clark to provide the capital, and got E.A. Dyer to provide the expertise to build a new sugar beet factory on the Bixby's land.
The community that grew up around this new sugar beet factory complex—with its streets of company houses for workers and surrounding farms—came to be called Los Alamitos. Also, Clark and Hellman were intricately involved with the machinations and corporate dealings of railroad tycoon E. H. Harriman and Henry Edwards Huntington and the destiny of the Southern Pacific in Southern California. In addition, some time after establishing Los Alamitos, the Clarks completed their railroad from Los Angeles to Salt Lake City, establishing the desert stop of Las Vegas in the process.

In the early 1900s, sugar beets were delivered to a factory by horse and wagon. Economics and an elimination of a protective tariff, combined with an insect infestation in 1921, caused sugar-beet crop to drop significantly in Orange County and the eventual demise of the sugar beet industry there and in Los Alamitos. But the town that had sprung up continued to grow.

On the lands south of the factory (and current Orangewood Avenue), Fred H. Bixby, son of John Bixby and future member of the Cowboy Hall of Fame, used his sugar beet lands as a finishing ranch to fatten cattle before sending them off to slaughter (he also managed Hellman's lands in present Seal Beach). Bixby, one of the more progressive ranchers of his time, allowed European immigrant, Mexican, and Japanese farmers to rent the land and grow crops. At the beginning of World War II, the Japanese farmers were rounded up by the military and relocated to internment camps at Manzanar and elsewhere.

Just prior to and during early World War II, the area around Los Alamitos became a major center for the aircraft industry. The Clark heirs arranged for Donald Douglas to begin construction of the Douglas Aircraft Company aircraft plant just north of the Long Beach airport.  At the same time the Navy decided it needed an auxiliary airfield for its Reserve Training facility at the increasingly crowded Airport.  A touch and go field was built on the level ground just east of Los Alamitos in August 1940. This was the first military post in Orange County.  In February 1941, the Navy decided to move all their reserve aviation training from Long Beach and purchased what would become a 1300-acre facility.  Trainees and cadre began using the new facilities as early as November 1941, but it wasn't until May 1942 that NRAB Long Beach formally transitioned all operations to NRAB Los Alamitos. The new base provided many jobs and spurred growth in the town. After World War II, NRAB Los Alamitos was the busiest reserve air base in the nation for a while, especially during the Korean War, but by the late 1950s encroaching surrounding suburban residential development began to curtail its activity.  The Navy moved out in 1972 and in 1973, the California National Guard took over management of the base, re-designated an Armed Forces Reserve Center. Today, it is a reserve support center for units of the Army, Navy, National Guard and Marines, but is also a home to many other government agencies, including Homeland Security, FEMA and the State of California Office of Emergency Services.

Many former military personnel chose to stay on in Los Alamitos after the war, living in such new neighborhoods as Carrier Row, where streets are named for World War II aircraft carriers, many of which had been the home for Navy pilots trained at Los Alamitos. Carrier Row was actually not one unit, but three small subdivisions built separately in 1947–48, 1950, and 1955 by different builders. The first of these units was the Alamos Ranchos which was first occupied in April 1948. These homes had sewage problems, and the builder stopped after completing only the two blocks east of Lexington and south of Katella. In 1950, two more blocks were constructed under the name of Plainview Homes. Finally, in 1955, the tract was completed with the construction of Los Alamitos Park. Another subdivision of 193 units, Los Alamitos Terrace, was built in the area north of Old Town West, on land once used as grazing land for Bixby-operated dairy farm—whose main headquarters were located where Los Alamitos High School now stands.

But overall, these units were small compared to the next subdivision built in the area. In 1956 builder Ross Cortese purchased land to build the walled community of Rossmoor just southwest from the townsite of Los Alamitos. Rossmoor, still the largest single development in Orange County, was the first walled community in the United States and quickly became home to over 10,000 upper middle class professionals. Rossmoor's homes were designed initially by Earle G. Kaltenbach (who also designed Disneyland's original Tomorrowland), although two of the later phases were designed by Chris Choate, who achieved much fame as the frequent partner of Cliff May. Together the two men were among the most responsible for designing and popularizing the "ranch" style homes which dominated the suburban explosion of the 1950s.  Prior to Rossmoor, Choate and May had worked with Cortese on building the nearby Lakewood Rancho Estates just a mile west of town in Long Beach.

Although Rossmoor never officially became part of Los Alamitos proper, it has become inextricably linked to the town. When Los Alamitos incorporated in 1960 its population was only about 3,400, while still-growing Rossmoor was nearing 10,000. Now they are fairly equal with Los Alamitos being slightly larger than 11,000.  Rossmoor, still an unincorporated part of Orange County, doesn't pay taxes to Los Alamitos, but the city virtually treats Rossmoor residents as if they were residents. In exchange, the city's many youth programs benefit from the overwhelming number of Rossmoor residents who volunteer for those programs, and Rossmoor, having very little commercial areas of its own, contributes much sales tax revenue to Los Alamitos.

The success of Rossmoor quickly led to other subdivisions in Los Alamitos—Dutch Haven (built in 1960 by Luxury Homes, and William G. Lyon), the Rossmoor Highlands (1961), Suburbia, New Dutch Haven, Greenbrook and College Park North (1967).

The ambitious sugar-beet processor of today would be hard pressed to set up shop in Los Alamitos. Zoning laws keep out heavy manufacturing or industry because nearly all the city land is developed. The Armed Forces Reserve Center takes up 48 percent of the city's . The rest of the city is a snug fitting mix of homes, apartments, businesses and open space.

The small city has been the hometown for a number of noted athletes including baseball Hall of Famer Bob Lemon(although he spent more time in Long Beach), and Olympic gymnast Cathy Rigby.  The Los Alamitos youth baseball leagues, which began in 1958 as the Rossmoor Little League and, after moving its fields to the Navy base, eventually changed its name to Los Alamitos Youth baseball - LAYB)  has been home to many future major leaguers including Andy Messersmith, who challenged baseball's reserve clause and helped established free agency in professional sports . At one point in the late 1980s, six former league players were playing baseball in the major leagues—Robb Nen, J. T. Snow, Greg Harris, Dennis Lamp, Greg Pirkl, and Mike Kelly. The area is also home to record holding long-distance swimmer Lynne Cox. It was also home to California Supreme Court Chief Justice Malcolm M. Lucas while he served on the Court, and to award-winning mystery writer Jan Burke.

Geography 
Los Alamitos is bounded by Cypress to the north and east, West Garden Grove to the east, and Seal Beach to the south. The census-designated place of Rossmoor is enclosed by Los Alamitos to the north, east, and west. The city shares a northwestern border with Los Angeles County's Long Beach, namely the El Dorado Park neighborhood. Coyote Creek serves as a major geographical divider between Los Alamitos and Long Beach.

Climate 
Gardeners use several climate zone indicators to determine the proper plantings for an area. In the U.S. most plants and seeds are indicated for a particular climate by the USDA Hardiness Zone. A more exact measure is the Sunset zone. In Los Alamitos, the USDA Hardiness Zone is 9. The Sunset climate zone is 22.

Demographics

2010
The 2010 United States Census reported that Los Alamitos had a population of 11,449. The racial makeup of Los Alamitos was 8,131 (71.0%) White (58.7% Non-Hispanic White), 324 (2.8%) African American, 51 (0.4%) Native American, 1,471 (12.8%) Asian, 50 (0.4%) Pacific Islander, 726 (6.3%) from other races, and 696 (6.1%) from two or more races. Hispanic or Latino of any race were 2,418 persons (21.1%).

The Census reported that 11,206 people (97.9% of the population) lived in households, 40 (0.3%) lived in non-institutionalized group quarters, and 203 (1.8%) were institutionalized.

There were 4,212 households, out of which 1,610 (38.2%) had children under the age of 18 living in them, 2,025 (48.1%) were opposite-sex married couples living together, 731 (17.4%) had a female householder with no husband present, 282 (6.7%) had a male householder with no wife present. There were 209 (5.0%) unmarried opposite-sex partnerships, and 19 (0.5%) same-sex married couples or partnerships. 885 households (21.0%) were made up of individuals, and 355 (8.4%) had someone living alone who was 65 years of age or older. The average household size was 2.66. There were 3,038 families (72.1% of all households); the average family size was 3.10.

The population was spread out, with 2,741 people (23.9%) under the age of 18, 1,077 people (9.4%) aged 18 to 24, 2,938 people (25.7%) aged 25 to 44, 3,099 people (27.1%) aged 45 to 64, and 1,594 people (13.9%) who were 65 years of age or older. The median age was 38.7 years. For every 100 females, there were 89.5 males. For every 100 females age 18 and over, there were 87.1 males.

The homeowner vacancy rate was 0.8%; the rental vacancy rate was 3.1%. 5,274 people (46.1% of the population) lived in owner-occupied housing units and 5,932 people (51.8%) lived in rental housing units.

According to the 2010 United States Census, Los Alamitos had a median household income of $80,449, with 7.2% of the population living below the federal poverty line.

2000
As of the census of 2000, there were 11,536 people, 4,246 households, and 3,035 families residing in the city. The population density was 2,875.5 inhabitants per square mile (1,110.7/km2). The racial makeup of the city was 77.0% White, 2.6% African American, 3.7% Native American, 9.5% Asian, 11.5% Pacific Islander, 5.1% from other races, and 4.1% from two or more races. Hispanic or Latino of any race were 22.3% of the population.

There were 4,246 households, out of which 36.6% had children under the age of 18 living with them, 48.4% were married couples living together, 17.1% had a female householder with no husband present, and 28.5% were non-families. 21.8% of all households were made up of individuals, and 7.7% had someone living alone who was 65 years of age or older. The average household size was 2.62 and the average family size was 3.06.

In the city, the population was spread out, with 25.2% under the age of 18, 7.8% from 18 to 24, 30.8% from 25 to 44, 21.3% from 45 to 64, and 14.8% who were 65 years of age or older. The median age was 37 years. For every 100 females, there were 90.0 males. For every 100 females age 18 and over, there were 84.4 males.

The median income for a household in the city was $55,286, and the median income for a family was $60,767. Males had a median income of $49,946 versus $36,002 for females. The per capita income for the city was $26,014. About 4.1% of families and 5.2% of the population were below the poverty line, including 4.9% of those under age 18 and 8.8% of those age 65 or over.
Property prices in the city have increased dramatically over the past 20 years.

Government

There is a city council.

According to the California Secretary of State, as of February 10, 2019, Los Alamitos has 6,407 registered voters. Of those, 2,310 (36.05%) are registered Republicans, 2,067 (32.26%) are registered Democrats, and 1,712 (26.72%) have declined to state a political party/are independents.

Economy
The first Claim Jumper restaurant opened in Los Alamitos in 1977. The location closed and is now a Hof's Hut. Neverland Studios, a recording studio that was often used by Christian rock bands, was originally located in Los Alamitos. Tillys had its original location in Los Alamitos.

Top employers
According to the City's 2010 Comprehensive Annual Financial Report, the top employers in the city are:

Notable people
 Dana Andrews, actor
 Aaron Barrett (born 1974), musician, Founding member of Reel Big Fish
 Jonathan Bornstein (born 1984), soccer player for USA National Team, Chivas USA, and Chicago Fire
 Tim Carey, football player—attended Los Alamitos HS, but grew up in Seal Beach
 Kami Cotler (born 1965), actress
 Lynne Cox, long-distance swimmer
 Landry Fields, basketball player for New York Knicks of the NBA—attended Los Alamitos HS, but grew up in Long Beach
 Scott Klopfenstein, musician, former member of Reel Big Fish
 Chris Kluwe, former punter for the Minnesota Vikings of the NFL—attended Los Alamitos HS, but grew up in Seal Beach
 Bob Lemon, baseball Hall of Famer as pitcher and manager, lived in City Garden Acres (now Apartment Row) and attended Laurel Elementary before family moved to Long Beach
 Marcedes Lewis, tight end for the Green Bay Packers of the NFL
 Allison Mack, actress (known as "Chloe" from Smallville)
 Taryn Manning (born 1978), actress
 Matthew Morrison, singer and actor (Broadway plays, Fox TV's Glee) -- attended Los Alamitos HS, but grew up in Cypress
 Tony Muser, former MLB player and manager
 Robb Nen, baseball player—attended Los Alamitos HS, but grew up in Seal Beach
 Cathy Rigby, Olympic gymnast and actress
 Matt "Money" Smith, Fox Sports Radio talk show host
 J.T. Snow (born 1968), baseball player—attended Los Alamitos HS, but grew up in Seal Beach
 Jodie Sweetin, actress ("Stephanie Tanner" from Full House)
 Ralph Flanagan (swimmer), Olympic swimmer
 Nikki Monninger, bass guitarist for Silversun Pickups

Schools
It is a part of the Los Alamitos Unified School District, which began in 1898 as the Laurel Elementary School District, and changed its name in 1953 to the Los Alamitos Elementary School District, providing education up through sixth grade.  Students in Grades 7-12 attended schools in the Anaheim School District, until 1979 when local voters, after a few failed attempts, finally received state permission to hold an election, and voted to withdraw from the Anaheim High School District and unify all their local grades under the name the Los Alamitos Unified School District.
 Los Alamitos High School  (opened September 1967, moved into current permanent location in September 1968)
 Laurel High School (continuation school, absorbed into Los Alamitos High School in 2014)
 McAuliffe Middle School (originally named Pine Jr. High)
 Oak Middle School (originally named Oak Jr. High)
 Hopkinson Elementary in Rossmoor, California
 Lee Elementary in Rossmoor, California
 Los Alamitos Elementary
 Rossmoor Elementary in Rossmoor, California
 Weaver Elementary in Rossmoor, California
 St. Hedwig School, a K–8 private school

References

External links

 
 Los Alamitos Chamber of Commerce: History
 Local History for Los Alamitos, Rossmoor & Seal Beach

 
Cities in Orange County, California
Incorporated cities and towns in California
Populated places established in 1960
1960 establishments in California